On 5 August, the day of the 2016 Summer Olympics opening ceremony, police in Rio de Janeiro arrested two people for attempted illegal resale of hundreds of tickets allocated to the Olympic Council of Ireland (OCI). The scandal precipitated the dramatic arrest of OCI president Pat Hickey, while in a hotel room assigned to his son. Hickey immediately resigned, as well as relinquishing his membership of the International Olympic Committee, his role as president of the European Olympic Committees and his role as vice-president of the Association of National Olympic Committees.

First arrests
On 5 August, the day of the 2016 Summer Olympics opening ceremony, police in Rio de Janeiro arrested two people for attempted illegal resale of hundreds of tickets allocated to the Olympic Council of Ireland (OCI). One of the two, Kevin Mallon, was an executive with THG Sports, which was the OCI's authorised ticket reseller (ATR) in 2012 but not 2016; the OCI denied any involvement. Pro 10 Sports Management, the OCI's 2016 ATR, said the man arrested was working as their agent to distribute tickets which had been paid for legitimately.

Arrest of Hickey
On 17 August, Pat Hickey, the OCI president, was arrested in Rio in connection with the investigation. A Brazilian judge remanded him in custody after concluding Hickey was a flight risk, and citing previous experience of then THG CEO James Sinton being investigated in relation to a 2014 FIFA World Cup ticket scam, being granted bail, leaving Brazil and never returning to face justice. Hickey was charged with three crimes. On 18 August, Hickey resigned as President of the OCI and that role passed to Willie O'Brien; Hickey also resigned his membership of the International Olympic Committee, his role as president of the European Olympic Committees and his role as vice-president of the Association of National Olympic Committees. At a news conference that afternoon, police presented Hickey's passport, Olympic credentials and air ticket to the world's media and explained that Rio's Civil Police Fraud Unit had arrested Hickey at about 6 a.m. (10 a.m. in Ireland). Having initially been told by his wife that her husband had returned to Ireland, Hickey was discovered in a separate hotel room assigned to his son and taken into custody. He was later photographed being wheeled from a hospital after complaining about heart problems and being given the all-clear by medical staff. On 20 August, Hickey and Mallon were reported to be sharing a prison cell. The same day, Brazilian police were reported to be investigating bank accounts linked to Hickey and others, stated their belief that a "relationship" exists between Hickey and English businessman Marcus Evans (owner of THG Sports) and told of an attempt being made to profit by millions of euro. Meanwhile, former Irish sports minister Leo Varadkar revealed Hickey tried to get financial assistance from Ireland's government for his son's corporate hospitality venue at London's 2012 Summer Olympics.

On August 24, 2016, Rio Police presented details of emails between Marcus Evans of THG and Hickey discussing the sale of tickets for the 2016 Rio Olympics.

Charges and suspension of case
Hickey was due to face trial in Brazil over his alleged role in the Olympic Council of Ireland (OCI) ticketing affair after a Rio de Janeiro judge accepted the charges made by a public prosecutor against him and nine others.
Public prosecutor Marcos Kac charged Hickey and nine others with ticket-touting, ambush marketing, theft, tax evasion, money-laundering, and criminal association.
 Hickey was allowed his passport back in November 2016 for a bond payment of 410,000 Euros. The month after The Association of National Olympic Committees (ANOC) loaned the money to Hickey so he could go back to Ireland. But in November 2017, the Brazilian Supreme Court suspended the case against Hickey and the other accused, all of whom deny any wrongdoing, in order to examine the merits of the prosecution case and of the Habeas Corpus request by lawyers for one of his co-accused, Kevin Mallon of THG Sports, after the lawyers had argued that they could not mount a proper defence as the prosecution had presented no evidence, and "nor was there clarity on his alleged involvement in any crime". It was not known how long this would take, and this was still unclear in June 2019 when Olympic Federation of Ireland President Sarah Keane expressed the hope that the International Olympic Committee's Ethics Commission would conclude its own investigation of the case before the 2020 Tokyo Olympics. In the meantime, Hickey and others had been criticised for lack of cooperation by the subsequent Moran inquiry into the matter.

Role of Shane Ross
Before Hickey's arrest, Irish Minister for Transport, Tourism and Sport Shane Ross promised a "robust inquiry" of his own, after expressing concern at the lack of an independent investigation. On 14 August, Ross flew to Rio de Janeiro to meet with Hickey. He did so twice, "in tense circumstances" shortly before Hickey's arrest. Ross attempted to have Hickey permit an independent member be included on the OCI's inquiry. Following Hickey's arrest, Ross flew back in Dublin to meet Attorney General Máire Whelan. Meanwhile, Brazilian police revealed an email they found on Hickey's phone calling for Ross to be "put back into his box".

John Delaney, et al.
On 21 August, Brazilian police conducted an early morning raid at the Irish office in the Olympic village. They confiscated the passports of three OCI members; Team Ireland Chef de Mission Kevin Kilty, OCI Secretary General Dermot Henihen and OCI chief executive Stephen Martin. They also confiscated electronic equipment and unused Olympic tickets. The other names on the warrant included OCI officials Linda O'Reilly and Willie O'Brien, the man who had earlier replaced Hickey as president.

The passports of Team Ireland Chef de Mission Kevin Kilty, OCI Secretary General Dermot Henihen and OCI chief executive Stephen Martin were subsequently returned as they were deemed to be of no further interest to the investigation.

Brazilian police were also given permission to seize a sixth passport, that of Football Association of Ireland (FAI) chief executive John Delaney, who is also OCI vice-president and was a prominent figure in Irish sport.

Investigations

Non-statutory inquiry
A non-statutory inquiry headed by retired High Court judge, Mr Justice Carroll Moran, to investigate the issue was announced on 24 August.

OCI review
On 25 August, the OCI announced data security firm Espion to secure, copy and seal the OCI server and all OCI electronic data. The following day, the OCI announced it had appointed auditors Grant Thornton to conduct its own review of the issue.

On 9 September the OCI announced, that it had chosen Deloitte to review the manner in which the OCI is governed under its current constitution.

References

External links
 What happened when? A timeline of Ireland's Olympic ticketing scandal
 Making headlines: How the world reacted to the arrest of Ireland's Pat Hickey
 Paul Kimmage: As he languishes in jail, how did Pat Hickey become the most hated man in Irish sport?
 Olympic ticketing scandal: Who is Marcus Evans?

2016 Summer Olympics
2016 scandals
Olympic Games controversies
Olympic Ticket Scandal
Ticket Scandal
2016 crimes in Brazil
Olympic Ticket
Olympic Ticket
Tickets